There are many lighthouses along the long coastline of India and in the associated islands. They are administered by the Directorate General of Lighthouses and Lightships, Government of India whose headoffice is located in Noida.

They are categorized for administrative reasons into nine directorates: Gandhidham, Jamnagar, Mumbai, Goa, Cochin, Chennai, Visakhapatnam, Kolkata and Port Blair.

Gandhidham directorate 
Office located in Gandhidham:
 Kandla
 Bhadreshwar
 Balachhadi
 Navalakhi
 Chhachhi
 Harudi
 Jakhau
 Narayan Sarovar (Koteshwar)
 Vanku
 Chudeshwar
 Mundra (Navinal)
 Mandvi
 Okha

Jamnagar directorate 
Office located in Jamnagar:
 Alang
 Bhidbhanjan
 Bural
 Chank
 Daman
 Diu-Head
 Dwaraka
 Ghogha
 Gopnath Bhavnagar
 Jafrabad
 Jegri
 Jodiya
 Mangrol
 Jhanjhmer
 Kachhighadh
 Kalubhar
 Mawadi
 Mungra
 Navadra
 Navi Bandar
 Piram Island
 Pirotan Island
 Porbandar
 Preigee Main Lightship
 Ruvapari
 Saiyad Rajapara
 Savaibet
 Simar
 Veraval

Mumbai directorate 
Office located in Mumbai:
 Arnala
 Chaul Kadu
 Devgarh
 Hazira, Surat
 Jaigarh Head, Ratnagiri
 Kanai Creek
 Kanhoji Angre Island
 Korlai, Korlai Fort
 Luhara (formerly Broach Point)
 Malpe
 Nanwel
 Prong's Lighthouse, Mumbai
 Ratnagiri
 Satpati
 St. George Island
 Tarapur
 Tolkeshwar point
 Uttan
 Khadi, Valsad
 Wagapur Point
 Wasi Borsi, Navsari

Mumbai Harbour
 Dolphin Lighthouse, Mumbai
 Sunk Rock Lighthouse, Mumbai

Goa directorate 

Office located in Goa:
 Aguada, Fort Aguada, Goa
 Suratkal point
 Honavar
 Betul
 Kap (Kaup)
 Bhatkal
 Vengurla Point
 Vengurla Rocks
 Oyster Rock Lighthouse, Karwar
 Kundapura
 Tadri

Cochin directorate 

Office located in Cochin:
 Agatti
 Alleppey (Alappuzha Lighthouse, Alappuzha)
 Amini
 Androth-East
 Androth-West
 Azhikode Lighthouse
 Beypore Lighthouse
 Bitra Island, Lakshadweep
 Cannanore
 Chetlat Island, Lakshadweep
 Chetwai Lighthouse
 Kadalur Point Lighthouse
 Kadamath
 Kalpeni
 Kasaragod Lighthouse
 Kavaratti Island, Lakshadweep
 Kiltan North, Kiltan Island, Lakshadweep
 Kiltan South
 Manakkodam Lighthouse, Andhakaranazhy
 Minicoy North, Minicoy Island Lighthouse, Lakshadweep
 Minicoy South
 Mount Dilly Lighthouse, Kannur
 Ponnani Lighthouse
 Suhelipar
 Thinnakara
 Valiyakara
 Vypin or Cochin
 Anjengo Lighthouse, Anjengo, Trivandrum
 Kovilthottam Lighthouse, Chavara, Kollam
 Vizhinjam Lighthouse, Trivandrum
 Tangasseri Lighthouse, Kollam

Others
 Kovalam Lighthouse, Trivandrum
 Karwar
 Ezhimala Lighthouse, Payyannur, Kannur
 Kozhikode Lighthouse, Kozhikode
 Light House Hill, Mangalore, Karnataka
 Tellicherry Lighthouse, Thalassery, Kannur

Chennai directorate 

Office located in Chennai:
 Kaniyakumari
 Pulicat
 Mahabalipuram Lighthouse
 Porto Novo
 Nagapattinam
 Point Calimere
 Kodikkarai
 Mallipatinam
 Passipattinam
 Rameswaram Lighthouse
 Pamban Island Lighthouse
 Kadappakam
 Pandiyan Tivu Lighthouse, Tuticorin
 Manapad Lighthouse
 Ammapattinam
 Kilakarai Lighthouse
 Vembar
 Kovilthottam Lighthouse, Kollam
 Chennai Lighthouse
 Pondicherry Lighthouse, Puducherry
 Cuddalore
 Poompuhar
 Karaikal
 Olakuda
 Muttom point

Others

 Cape Comorin

Visakhapatnam directorate 

Office located in Visakhapatnam:
 Santapille Lighthouse, Chintapalli
 Bheemunipatnam
 Dolphin's Nose, Visakhapatnam
 Pudimadaka
 Pentakota
 Vakalapudi, Kakinada
 Sacramento Lighthouse, Bojjavaripeta
 Ramayapatnam
 Antervedi
 Machilipatnam
 Nagayalanka
 Nizampatnam
 Vodarevu
 Iskapalli
 Krishnapatnam
 Armagon
 Ravaport

Kolkata directorate 
 Baruva
 Chandrabhaga Lighthouse, Konark
 Dariapur Lighthouse, Gopalpur-on-Sea
 False Point at Kendrapara district of Odisha
 Gopalpur-on-Sea Lighthouse at Gopalpur, Odisha
 Kalingapatnam
 Paradip Lighthouse, Paradip
 Prayagi
 Puri Lighthouse
 Saugor

Others
 Digha
 Sagar Island
 Tajpur lighthouse, West Bengal

Port Blair directorate 
Office located in Port Blair:
 Andaman Strait Eastern Entrance Lighthouse, Baratang
 Awes Island Lighthouse, near Mayabunder
 Battimalv Lighthouse, Car Nicobar
 Bompoka, near Teressa (Nicobar Islands)
 Cape Connaught Lighthouse, Nancowry Island
 Chidiya Tapu Lighthouse, South Andaman Island
 Chowra island, near Nancowry Island, Nicobar Islands
 East Island Lighthouse, Diglipur, North Andaman Island
 Indira Point, Great Nicobar Island
 Interview Island, Andaman Islands
 Kabra Island, Nicobar Islands
 Katchal Island West Bay
 Katchal East Bay Lighthouse
 Keating Point Lighthouse, Car Nicobar
 Little Andaman
 Menchal Island, Nicobar Islands
 Middle Button Island, Ritchie's Archipelago
 Narcondam Island, Andaman Islands
 North Brother Island
 North Button Island, Ritchie's Archipelago
 North Cinque Island
 North Point Lighthouse, Port Blair
 Port Cornwallis Lighthouse, Ross Island
 Pulo Milo, Nicobar Islands
 Rosen Point Lighthouse, near Campbell Bay
 Rutland Island
 Sir Hugh Rose Island, Ritchie's Archipelago
 South Button Island, Ritchie's Archipelago
 South Sentinel Island, Andaman Islands
 Strait Island
 Tillanchang Lighthouse, Nicobar Islands
 Wilson Island, Ritchie's Archipelago

Others
 Barren Island, Andaman Islands
 Havelock Island Lighthouse, Havelock Island

See also 
 Lists of lighthouses and lightvessels

References

External links 

 Official website of Directorate General of Lighthouses & Lightships, India

Lighthouses
Lighthouses
India
Lists of tourist attractions in India